Chryseomicrobium amylolyticum  is a Gram-positive, rod-shaped and non-motile bacterium from the genus of Chryseomicrobium which has been isolated from semi-arid tropical soil from India.

References

External links
Type strain of Chryseomicrobium amylolyticum at BacDive -  the Bacterial Diversity Metadatabase	

Bacillales
Bacteria described in 2013